Huaxia Life Insurance Co., Ltd. known also as Hua Insurance in English, is a Chinese insurance company based in Tianjin. In July 2020, the Chinese government announced that it would take over the company.

Equity investments

 Guangzhou Aoyu (46.04%)
 Leshi Zhixin (1.1310%)
 Ping An Insurance (3.40%)

Shareholders

  (20.00%)
  (20.00%)
  (14.90%)
  (13.40%)

  (13.37%)
  (11.24%)
 Tianjin Port Group (5.23%)
  (0.98%)

  (0.35%)
  (0.30%)
  (0.13%)
  (0.09%)

References

External links
  

Life insurance companies of China
Companies based in Tianjin
Chinese companies established in 2006
Financial services companies established in 2006
Privately held companies of China